{{Infobox football club
| clubname = FC Melbourne Srbija 
| image = Fitroy city serbia logo.PNG
| upright = 0.6
| alt = Fitzroy City Serbia logo
| fullname = FC Melbourne SrbijaSoccer Club
| nickname = Serbia, Srbija
| founded =  as Srbija Soccer Club
| ground = Kevin Bartlett Reserve  F.R Smith Drive Burnley, Victoria
| capacity = 2,500
| chairman = Milan Ilić
| coach = Nik Kovačević
| league = State League 1 South East
| season = 2022
| position = 5th
| pattern_la1 = 
| pattern_b1 = 
| pattern_ra1 = 
| leftarm1 = ff0000
| body1 = ff0000
| rightarm1 = ff0000
| shorts1 = 0000ff
| socks1 = ffffff
| pattern_la2 = 
| pattern_b2 = 
| pattern_ra2 = 
| leftarm2 = ffffff
| body2 = ffffff
| rightarm2 = ffffff
| shorts2 = ffffff
| socks2 = ffffff|
}}

FC Melbourne Srbija Soccer Club (Serbian Cyrillic: ФК Мелбурн Србија), commonly known as Melbourne Serbia (formerly known as Fitzroy City Srbija Soccer Club from 1991 to 2022) is an Australian soccer club based in Melbourne, Victoria. The club was founded by Serbian Australians in 1963 and currently competes in the Victorian State League Division One - South-East.

 History 

 Early history 
The club was founded in 1963. In 1966 the club became a member of the Victorian Provisional League and in the same year renamed to Carlton Serbia. The club was founded primarily by members of the St. Sava Orthodox Church in Carlton, Victoria. Carlton Serbia played most of their home games in the inner suburbs of Melbourne and featured mainly players from the local Serbian Australian Community.
Subsequently, the club merged with Ringwood United and became known as Ringwood Serbia. In 1991 the club became Fitzroy City or Fitzroy Serbia and played its games at the old ground of the ex VFL/AFL club Fitzroy Lions at Edinburgh Gardens in Fitzroy, noticeable players of the club including Nik Kovacevic, Zlatko Mihajlovic, Miki Sedlarevic, Sasha Milenkovic and Nick Gameras. Enjoying their best results ever:

 1969 Victorian Provisional League champions
 1971 Victorian District League Central Divisions Champions
 1972 Victorian Provisional League Champions
 2000 Victorian State League Division Two North West Champions
 2009 Victorian Provisional League Division One South East Champions

Supporters and Legacy Fitzroy City "Srbija" is the oldest Serbian backed soccer club in Victoria.
The supporters of Fitzroy City "Srbija" are called "Melbourne Srbija Firma" or "MSF".

 Premier League Years 

In 2002, Fitzroy City Serbia competed in the Victorian Premier League (VPL). After many successful years Fitzroy climbed up to the VPL in season 2002 where they spent a season before being relegated on the final day of the season finishing with 22 points – one point less than St. Albans Dinamo.  The club's glory moment in the VPL came in a 4–1 win over the then mighty Port Melbourne Sharks.

 Recent Years 

On 2 February 2000 Fitzroy City played former European and World Champions Red Star Belgrade in Heidelberg.  After taking an early led, Fitzroy were beaten 3–1.  A man of the match performance was put in by Bojo Jevdevic keeping the Red Star players at bay in the first half.
In the 2006 season the club competed in State League 3 South East ending the season in 6th place. Nikola Veljovic finished the season with the most league goals – 23!
In season 2007 the club was relegated into Provisional League one South East from State League 3 South East. During the 2007 season Fitzroy City ended the season with 8 wins and 14 losses from 22 matches finishing in 10th and again being relegated.

In the 2009 season, Fitzroy City restored some long lost pride by finishing the season as champions of the Victorian Provisional League Division 1 South East. Nothing stated the dominance of the club more than the final day thrashing of close rivals Mooroolbark 6–0.  Nathan Jones finished the season as the club's top scorer with 10 goals.

In 2010, Fitzroy City finished 5th in its first year back in Victorian State League Division Three South-East.  Henry Wootton had his best year at Fitzroy City picking up the club's Best and Fairest and Top Goal Scorer honors. Among the other winners, Shannon Griffin was voted Best Young Player, Valina Clearwater was named Women's Best and Fairest player and Prudence Robertson finished the season as the Women's Top Goal Scorer.

The 2012 season was a success after a turbulent start. Fitzroy City finished second behind Doveton and ahead of Springvale Bosna which meant promotion into State League 2, NW.
The club is currently coached by Nik Kovacevic who played for the club. 

 Gallery 

 Achievements 

 League 

 Victorian State League Division 3
 Runner-up (x1) : 2012
 Victorian State League Division 1
 Runners-up(x1) : 2001
 Victorian State League Division 2
 Champions (x2) : 2000, 2019
 Victorian State League Division 3
 Runner-up (x1) : 1999
 Victorian Provisional League Division 1 (5th tier in Victoria)
 Champions (x1) : 2009

 Cup 
 Karadjordje Cup
 Champions (x3)'' : 1988, 1997, 2022

Top club goal scorers 

 2022 - Henrique Pimenta - 10
 2019 - James Papadimitriou  - Unknown
 2018 – Aleksandar Hrkalović – Unknown
 2017 – Aleksandar Hrkalović – 11
 2016 – Danilo Bonilla – 12
 2015 – Souheil Azagane – 11
 2014 – Joshua D'Alessi – 10
 2013 – Aleks Dimitrijevici  - 5
 2012 – James Stellini – 7
 2011 – Nathan Jones – 7
 2010 – Henry Wootton – 13
 2009 – Nathan Jones – 10
 2008 – Stewart Peuterer – 13
 2007 – Stewart Peuterer – 8
 2006 – Nikola Veljovic – 17
 2005 – Ignjat Filipovic – 7
 2004 – Aca Stevanovic – 4
 2003 – Ivan Jovanovic – 4
 2002 – Vasko Trp~evski – 5
 2001 – Zlatko Mihajlovic – 13
 2000 – Michael Maljanek – 20 (Also State League Div 2 North West Top Scorer)
 1999 – Miroslav Nikolic – 10
 1998 – Rados Krasic – 9
 1997 – Sasa Milenkovic – 5
 1996 – Nick Gameras – 10
 1995 – Marjan Marinkovic & Nick Gameras – 5
 1994 – Sasha Milenkovic – 8

References

External links 
Official site
 

Serbian sports clubs in Australia
Soccer clubs in Melbourne
Association football clubs established in 1963
1963 establishments in Australia
Fitzroy, Victoria
Sport in the City of Yarra